Jack Cooper Love (born 25 December 2001) is a Swedish professional footballer who plays as a forward for Skövde AIK on loan from Elfsborg.

Club career
Cooper Love started his career with Aneby SK, playing for their senior side in Division 4 during 2016 and 2017. In 2017, he joined Elfsborg, making his senior debut for the club in February 2021 as a substitute in the Svenska Cupen. Two months later, he made his Allsvenskan debut, appearing as a late substitute in the 3-1 win over Varbergs BoIS. On 13 September 2021, Cooper Love signed a new contract with Elfsborg and subsequently joined Superettan side Örgryte on loan for the rest of the season.

On 24 February 2022, Cooper Love returned to Superettan and joined Skövde AIK.

Personal life
Cooper Love was born in Sweden to English parents from Bury.

Honours
Individual
Superettan Young Player of the Year: 2022

References

External links

Profile at Swedish FA

2001 births
Living people
Swedish footballers
Swedish people of English descent
Association football forwards
IF Elfsborg players
Örgryte IS players
Skövde AIK players
Allsvenskan players
Superettan players